The climate of New Zealand is varied due to the country's diverse landscape. Most regions of New Zealand belong to the temperate zone with a maritime climate (Köppen climate classification: Cfb) characterised by four distinct seasons. Winters are relatively mild and summers comparatively cool. The main contributing factors are the Pacific Ocean and latitude, although the mountain ranges can cause significant climate variations in locations barely tens of kilometres from each other. Conditions vary from extremely wet on the West Coast of the South Island to almost semi-arid in Central Otago and subtropical in Northland.

Weather

The Meteorological Service of New Zealand Limited (MetService), established as a state-owned enterprise in 1992, issues weather forecasts and official weather warnings.

Rainfall
Rainfall is normally distributed evenly throughout the year in most parts of the country, especially in the South Island. Northern and eastern parts of the country, including Auckland, Christchurch and Wellington see a slight winter maximum consistent with a Mediterranean climate. Summer and autumn maxima can be found in places closer to the southwest, such as Invercargill and Milford Sound.

How much rain a place receives is highly dependent on topography. The Southern Alps, the North Island Volcanic Plateau and surrounding ranges can produce large variation in rainfalls in places barely tens of kilometres apart. Milford Sound receives over 6,700 mm (264 Inches) of the rainfall a year on average while barely 100 km (62 Miles) away Alexandra in Central Otago receives only slightly greater than 300 mm annually, giving it a borderline oceanic/semi-arid climate. Air laden with water vapour from the ocean is pushed from the west in response to Earth’s rotation. This weather circulates the southern seas largely unimpeded by land until it reaches the Southern Alps.  The humid westerly wind is forced up over the mountains, at cooler elevation water condenses and falls as snow or rain. This orographic rain explains the huge difference in conditions between the wet west and dry east of the South Island.

Snowfall

Snow falls in New Zealand's South Island and at higher altitudes in the North Island. It is extremely rare at sea level in the North Island.  Snow is more common inland in both main islands, though snow to sea level does occur on average once or twice per year in the central and southern South Island.

Temperature
As with many islands in the world, the influence of the ocean curtails any extremes in coastal temperature. The greater temperature ranges are found in the interior of the Canterbury and Otago regions, and especially Central Otago. Central Otago and inland Canterbury's Mackenzie Basin have the closest New Zealand has to continental climates, being generally drier (due in part to föhn winds) and less directly modified by the ocean. These areas can experience summer temperatures in the low 30s °C (high 80s/low 90s °F) and snow and severe frosts in winter, the latter exacerbated by hoar frosts in the river valleys and basins.

Annual mean temperature

The coldest month is usually July and the warmest month is usually January or February. Generally there are relatively small variations between summer and winter temperatures. An example of this is Auckland which has a variation of just 9 °C or 16 °F between the average mid-winter high temperature and average mid-summer high temperature. Temperature variation throughout the day is also relatively small. The exception to this is inland areas and to the east of the ranges with daily variations that can be over 25 °C and differences of up to 14 °C between the average summer and winter high temperatures. Temperatures also drop about 0.7 °C or 1.3 °F for every 100 m (300ft) of altitude.

Summer

Daily maximum temperatures are normally in the mid to low 20s (°C) over most of the country. They are higher in northern, eastern and interior part of the country; Hastings is the warmest city on average with 25.5 °C followed by Gisborne with 24.9 °C and Napier with 24.5 °C. Eastern parts of the South Island are highly susceptible to the norwester, a Fohn wind which can result in temperatures going into the high 30s and even the low 40s. Rangiora in Canterbury holds the record maximum of 42.4 °C recorded in 1973, with Christchurch recording 41.6 °C in that same year. More recently, Timaru reached 41.3 °C on Waitangi Day in 2011. Due to these winds, the cooler South Island cities such as Dunedin, Christchurch and Invercargill have higher all-time record temperatures than places further north such as Wellington, Auckland and Whangarei.

Winter

Winter temperatures are much milder in New Zealand compared to other areas of similar latitude, with the exception of the Central Otago and Mackenzie Basin regions mentioned above. Maxima are generally  in the North Island, decreasing as one goes further south or inland.

Severe weather events
July 1863 The blizzard and flood of 1863 was a series of consecutive natural disasters in Central Otago in New Zealand's South Island. From July to August 1863 the Otago gold fields suffered from a combination of floods, snowstorms, and blizzards that caused heavy loss of life among the gold miners. At least 40 died during the July rains and more than 11 in the August snows. Sources using the earliest reports of loss of life tend to greatly overstate the numbers who died.

1–6 February 1868: The Great storm of 1868 was a violent storm that swept across much of New Zealand wrecking 12 ships and causing extensive flooding. About 40 lives were known lost and at the time an estimated £500,000 to £1 million worth of damage was caused. The storm is currently thought to have been an ex-tropical cyclone.

16 April 1897: The storm of 1897 was a severe storm that struck the lower to central North Island of New Zealand on 16 April 1897. It caused the ship Zuleika to run aground near Cape Palliser, with the loss of 12 lives, and severe flooding. At Clive the flooding caused the loss of a further 12 lives and one person was drowned near Kapiti. There were 6 further unconfirmed reports of drowning, bringing the total loss of life directly related to the storm event to between 25 and 31. Based on descriptions of the storm, particularly that of Captain Marten of the Waiapu, it may have been an ex-tropical cyclone.

2 February 1936: The Cyclone of 1936 was the worst storm of the 20th century in New Zealand.

10 April 1968:  Cyclone Giselle caused peak gusts of 145 knots (270 km/h) near Wellington, after colliding with an Antarctic storm moving north. Giselle led to the sinking of the interisland ferry TEV Wahine, and the loss of 53 lives. Total damage caused by the storm was estimated at $14 million.

20 December 1976: Heavy rain caused widespread flooding and landslides in Wellington City and Hutt Valley. Hutt River burst its stopbanks and workers in Petone took refuge on factory roofs while rail links between Wellington city and the Hutt were suspended stranding thousands of commuters. Landslides destroyed houses and a boy was killed by a collapsing wall when a slip struck a hall in Crofton Downs. More than 350 mm of rain fell in 24 hours.

6–10 March 1988: New Zealand is hit by a tropical cyclone once every eight to nine years. Cyclone Bola was one of the costliest cyclones in the history of New Zealand, causing severe damage as an extratropical cyclone when it passed near the country.

4 October 1997: More than 60 homes were flooded and residents in Lower Hutt riverside areas were evacuated during downpours. Two people died, and isolated landslips closed some Wellington roads and parts of State Highway 1.

26 June 1998: A severe thunderstorm affected Karori and Kelburn, with rain breaking all previous records and falling at a rate with a return period of well over 200 years. Rainfall at Kelburn totalled 69.5 mm between 7.35pm and 9.10pm.

13–27 October 1998:  Gale force northwesterlies blew throughout the lower North Island. On 18 October, gusts of 183 km/h were recorded at Castlepoint. Winds were most severe on the following two days, when a gust of 215 km/h was recorded on a Wairarapa farm. A truck was overturned, ships ripped from their moorings in Wellington, and some houses lost their roofs.

10 January 2002: Thunderstorms over Wellington resulted in torrential rainfall, about 40 mm in 30 minutes, and flash floods in the city centre. Similar storms, some with hail and surface flooding also happened in Whanganui, Manawatu, the central and eastern North Island, Buller and Nelson. The average recurrence interval of this rainfall event was estimated at more than 100 years.

14–16 February 2004: The Valentine's Day storms left hundreds of people homeless, and silt and floodwaters inundated considerable areas of farmland. Many rivers breached their banks, bridges were damaged and stock was swept away by floodwaters. A civil state of emergency was declared in Whanganui, Manawatu and Rangitikei. About 500 Lower Hutt residents were evacuated because of floodwaters, and many commuters were unable to enter Wellington. The event produced galeforce southerlies, with gusts of 230 km/h in the Tararua Range, and swells of 11m in Cook Strait.

25 July and 14 August 2011 New Zealand snowstorms: The first severe winter storm brought the coldest winter snap in fifteen years. During August snow fell consistently down to sea level in Wellington for the first time since 1976, and snowflakes even fell for a brief time in Auckland for the first time in 80 years.

20–21 June 2013 New Zealand storm: This extra-tropical system was first felt in the South Island by heavy snowfall on 18 and 19 June. Late on 20 June, the storm pushed northeast to the North Island, bringing very strong winds until early 23 June. Schools were cancelled during the shortest day (21 June), due to massive damage.

Statistics

By area

Records

Historical climate
Data collection for determining the New Zealand climate began in the late 19th century, although European explorers made valid observations of climate indicators such as glaciers and moraines early in that century. Scientific study of early New Zealand climate is quite recent and ongoing. It has settled some of the debate regarding links between the Little Ice Age (LIA) in the Northern Hemisphere and the climate in New Zealand at the same time. The key facts to emerge are that New Zealand did experience a noticeable cooler climate, but at a slightly later date than in the Northern Hemisphere. The onset of cooler climate was about 1450 and lasted until  1850. Indications are that temperatures were in the range of 1.5-2.0 degree Celsius lower than present during the New Zealand LIA. Since 2000 various scientific investigations looked at the behaviour of glaciers in relation to climate and found they were excellent indicators of temperatures, especially in summer. Glacial evidence of climate is matched by evidence of variations in tree ring growth and studies of ice core and ocean sediment samples indicating the types of microorganisms (some flourish in warm temperatures, other in cooler temperatures) and historical carbon dioxide ratios.

Evidence found that the climate was more strongly influenced by the impact of tropical air masses in warm periods and polar air masses in cool periods. Recent (2010) studies by Victoria University have shown that the regional climates most affected were in coastal Otago and Southland. The dominant temperature influence here was the relative warmth of the sea to the south of New Zealand during the Medieval Warm Period (MWP). From about 1350 this region was notably warmer but then cooled relatively quickly from 1450. This cooling may have had a substantial impact on population in those areas. The limited historical record suggests that from 1450 the population of New Zealand underwent significant cultural change which may have links to climate cooling and dramatic changes in food supplies.

Climate change

See also
Nor'west arch
Weather Channel (New Zealand)
Climate change in New Zealand

References

Further reading

Insurance Council of New Zealand: Cost of Disaster Events in New Zealand

External links
MetService (Meteorological Service of New Zealand), a government agency that is the major provider of weather data
MetVUW - a weather and climate service operated by Victoria University
MetVUW - forecasting
NIWA - National Climate Centre
NZ Weather - A New Zealand-based weather forum
New Zealand Weather Network (NZWN) - a live weather map of weather stations around New Zealand
List of private weather stations
Weather and Seasons in New Zealand

 
New Zealand